The 2008 season was the San Diego Chargers' 39th in the National Football League and their 49th overall. While they completed the regular season with only an 8–8 record, they nonetheless captured their third consecutive AFC West championship. In the first round of the playoffs, the Chargers upset the Indianapolis Colts, but they were eliminated the following week during their divisional round game on the road against the eventual Super Bowl champion Pittsburgh Steelers.

The Chargers became the first team to go 8–8 and win their division since the 1985 Cleveland Browns, and by winning their Wild Card playoff game against the Indianapolis Colts, became the first team in NFL history to actually go an entire season without having a winning record until after the first round of the playoffs. They also became the first team in NFL history to start the season 4–8 and make the playoffs, and the only team to do so in a 16-game schedule.

Contract negotiations
DB Clinton Hart was signed to a 5-year extension in April after being ranked 2nd on the team in Interceptions in his first full year as a starter.
LS David Binn was signed to a 4-year extension in May. He was the only remaining member of the Chargers’ 1994 Super Bowl team.

Notable roster additions
 LB Derek Smith – Signed as a free agent.
 OL L. J. Shelton – Signed as a free agent.
 RB Michael Bennett – Signed off waivers.

Notable roster losses
CB Drayton Florence – Left as a free agent. Signed with the Jacksonville Jaguars.
RB Michael Turner – Left as a free agent. Signed with the Atlanta Falcons.
SS Marlon McCree – Signed with the Denver Broncos.
RT Shane Olivea – Signed with the New York Giants.
FB Lorenzo Neal – Released. Signed with the Baltimore Ravens.
LB Derek Smith – Released after Michael Bennett (American football) was signed.

NFL Draft

Undrafted free agents
Mike Tolbert, FB, Coastal Carolina
Brandon Jackson, WR, North Texas
Gary Banks, WR, Troy
Greg Bracey, WR, Missouri
Billy Pittman, WR, Texas
Roy Betschart, H-back, Wyoming
John Tereshinski, TE, Wake Forest
Brandyn Dombrowski, G, San Diego State
Andrew Crummey, G, Maryland
Tyler Luellen, T, Missouri
Keith Shologan, DT, Central Florida
Lamar Divens, DT, Tennessee State
Eric Bakhtiari, OLB, University of San Diego
Josh Bell, CB, Baylor
Stanley Franks, CB, Idaho
Brian Bonner, S, Texas Christian
Billy Vinnedge, P/K, Wyoming

Roster

2008 schedule

Preseason

Regular season
In addition to their regular games with AFC West rivals, the Chargers played teams from the AFC East and NFC South as per the schedule rotation, and also played intraconference games against the Colts and the Steelers based on divisional positions from 2007.

On October 26, the Chargers had a game against the New Orleans Saints in London, England, where the Saints were the designated home team. i.e. They were playing their home game in London. This was the second NFL game played in London in as many years.

Note: Intra-division opponents are in bold text.
* NFL overseas game in England. New Orleans is the designated home team.
** Game time changed due to NBC's flex scheduling.

Standings

Regular season results

Week 1: vs. Carolina Panthers

The Chargers began their 2008 campaign at home against the Carolina Panthers. After a scoreless first quarter, the Panthers pounced first as kicker John Kasay got a 44-yard field goal. The Chargers would take the lead with QB Philip Rivers completing a 44-yard TD pass to WR Chris Chambers, yet Carolina would take the halftime lead as Kasay nailed a 33-yard and a 30-yard field goal. In the third quarter, San Diego got the lead with kicker Nate Kaeding getting a 27-yard field goal, yet the Panthers regained the lead with CB Chris Gamble returning a fumble 31 yards for a touchdown. In the fourth quarter, Carolina increased its lead with Kasay nailing a 49-yard field goal. Afterwards, the Chargers got the lead again with Rivers completing a 24-yard TD pass to TE Antonio Gates and a 5-yard TD pass to WR Vincent Jackson. Unfortunately for San Diego, Panthers QB Jake Delhomme threw the game-winning 14-yard TD pass to TE Dante Rosario as time expired.

With the loss, San Diego began its season at 0–1.

Week 2: at Denver Broncos

Hoping to rebound from their last-second home loss to the Panthers, the Chargers flew to Invesco Field at Mile High for a Week 2 AFC West duel with the Denver Broncos. In the first quarter, San Diego trailed early as FB Michael Pittman getting a 1-yard TD run, after a Philip Rivers pass to Chris Chambers was ruled an interception on the field. The Chargers challenged the ruling, but the replay system was inoperative to the officials, so the ruling on the field stood. The 'Bolts would respond with kicker Nate Kaeding getting a 34-yard field goal. In the second quarter, Denver increased its lead with QB Jay Cutler completing a 3-yard and a 14-yard TD pass to TE Tony Scheffler. San Diego would immediately respond with RB Darren Sproles returning a kickoff 103-yard for a touchdown, yet the Broncos replied with kicker Matt Prater getting a 52-yard field goal. The Chargers would strike at Denver's lead as QB Philip Rivers completing a 48-yard TD pass to WR Chris Chambers, yet the Broncos would end the half with Cutler completing a 6-yard TD pass to WR Brandon Marshall.

In the third quarter, the 'Bolts began to rally as Rivers completed a 15-yard TD pass to Chambers, along with Kaeding nailing a 21-yard field goal. In the fourth quarter, San Diego took the lead with Kaeding's 28-yard field goal and Rivers’ 66-yard TD pass to Sproles. However, Denver responded with a 12-play, 80-yard drive (which included a second controversial officiating call that turned a game-winning fumble into an incomplete pass) that concluded with Cutler completing a 4-yard TD pass to WR Eddie Royal, including Cutler's 2-point conversion pass to Royal.

Notable: The game has been titled by press and websites as "The Mile High Highjacking" after the officiating call that cost San Diego the game.

With the loss, the Chargers fell to 0–2.

Week 3: vs. New York Jets

Hoping to avoid an 0–3 start, the Chargers went home for a Week 3 MNF duel with the New York Jets. In the first quarter, San Diego trailed early as Jets CB David Barrett returned an interception 25 yards for a touchdown on QB Philip Rivers' first attempted pass of the game. The Chargers responded with kicker Nate Kaeding’s 36-yard field goal and a Rivers 1-yard TD pass to rookie FB Mike Tolbert. In the second quarter, the 'Bolts increased their lead as CB Antonio Cromartie returned an interception 52 yards for a touchdown. New York tried to answer as QB Brett Favre completed a 3-yard TD pass to WR Laveranues Coles, yet the Chargers replied with Rivers completing a 27-yard TD pass to WR Chris Chambers and a 6-yard TD pass to TE Antonio Gates.

In the third quarter, San Diego continued its march as RB LaDainian Tomlinson got a 2-yard TD run. In the fourth quarter, the Jets tried to rally as Favre completed a 4-yard TD pass to WR Chansi Stuckey (with a failed 2-point conversion) and kicker Jay Feely got a 32-yard field goal. San Diego would answer with Tomlinson's 2-yard TD run. New York tried to make another rally as Favre completed a 13-yard TD pass to TE Dustin Keller (with another failed 2-point conversion), yet the 'Bolts pulled away as Kaeding nailed a 49-yard field goal.

With the win, the Chargers improved to 1–2.

Week 4: at Oakland Raiders

Coming off their MNF home win over the Jets, the Chargers flew to Oakland–Alameda County Coliseum for a Week 4 AFC West duel with the Oakland Raiders. In the first quarter, the 'Bolts trailed early as Raiders kicker Sebastian Janikowski got a 22-yard field goal, along with Safety Gibril Wilson sacking QB Philip Rivers in his endzone for a safety. In the second quarter, San Diego continued to trail as QB JaMarcus Russell completed a 63-yard TD pass to TE Zach Miller, along with Janikowski's 28-yard field goal.

In the third quarter the Chargers began to rally as kicker Nate Kaeding made a 28-yard field goal. In the fourth quarter, the 'Bolts continued their rally as Rivers completed a 9-yard TD pass to TE Antonio Gates, along with RB LaDainian Tomlinson getting a 13-yard TD run (with a successful 2-point conversion pass from Rivers to RB Darren Sproles). Oakland tried to respond as Janikowski got a 32-yard field goal, yet San Diego completed its comeback with Kaeding making a 47-yard field goal and Tomlinson rushing for a 41-yard TD run.

With the win, the Chargers improved to 2–2.

Notable: Through 15 games against a single opponent, LaDainian Tomlinson set a new record in touchdowns and yards against an opponent previously held by Barry Sanders, 1,763 yards, and Marcus Allen, 20 Touchdowns, respectively, by totaling 1,815 yards and 21 touchdowns. In this game, Janikowski attempted and failed a 76-yard field goal.

Week 5: at Miami Dolphins

Coming off their divisional road win over the Raiders, the Chargers flew to Dolphin Stadium for a Week 5 duel with the Miami Dolphins. In the first quarter, the 'Bolts struck first with kicker Nate Kaeding getting a 34-yard field goal. The Dolphins would respond with kicker Dan Carpenter nailing a 47-yard field goal. In the second quarter, Miami took the lead as QB Chad Pennington completing a 17-yard TD pass to WR Greg Camarillo, along with RB Ronnie Brown getting a 5-yard TD run. In the third quarter, San Diego tried to rally as QB Philip Rivers completed a 17-yard TD pass to WR Chris Chambers (a former Dolphin). However, Miami's defense prevented the 'Bolts from striking again.

With the loss, the Chargers fell to 2–3.

Week 6: vs. New England Patriots

Hoping to rebound from their road loss to the Dolphins, the Chargers went home, donned their alternate uniforms, and played a Week 6 Sunday night duel with the New England Patriots, in a rematch of last year's AFC Championship game.

In the first quarter, the 'Bolts struck first as kicker Nate Kaeding got a 25-yard field goal, along with QB Philip Rivers completing a 49-yard TD pass to WR Malcom Floyd. In the second quarter, the Patriots got on the board as kicker Stephen Gostkowski got a 47-yard field goal. San Diego closed out the half with Rivers completing a 4-yard TD pass to WR Vincent Jackson.

In the third quarter, the Chargers continued its victory march as Rivers completed a 1-yard TD pass to TE Antonio Gates, along with Kaeding kicking a 35-yard field goal. In the fourth quarter, the 'Bolts closed out the night with Kaeding nailing a 35-yard field goal. New England would respond with RB Sammy Morris getting a 1-yard TD run, yet San Diego was too much for them.

With the win, the Chargers improved to 3–3.

Week 7: at Buffalo Bills

With the loss, the Chargers fell to 3–4.

Week 8: at New Orleans Saints

Hoping to rebound from their road loss to the Bills, the Chargers flew to Wembley Stadium for the 2008 International Series game with the New Orleans Saints.

In the first quarter, San Diego trailed early as kicker Taylor Mehlhaff got a 23-yard field goal. The 'Bolts would respond with kicker Nate Kaeding getting a 33-yard field goal. In the second quarter, New Orleans regained the lead as QB Drew Brees (a former Charger) completed a 12-yard TD pass to WR Devery Henderson (with a failed PAT) and RB Deuce McAllister getting a 1-yard TD run. San Diego answered as QB Philip Rivers completed a 12-yard TD pass to RB LaDainian Tomlinson, but the Saints replied with Brees completing a 30-yard TD pass to WR Lance Moore. The Chargers closed out the half with Rivers completing a 12-yard TD pass to TE Antonio Gates.

In the third quarter, New Orleans increased its lead Brees completing a 1-yard TD pass to TE Mark Campbell, after a very controversial Pass interference call on cornerback Cletis Gordon put the Saints on the 1-yard line. The 'Bolts would answer with Kaeding getting a 24-yard field goal. In the fourth quarter, the Saints continued to build its lead as FB Mike Karney got a 1-yard TD run. San Diego tried to rally as Kaeding nailed a 31-yard field goal, Rivers completed a 14-yard TD pass to WR Vincent Jackson, and Brees giving the 'Bolts a safety via an incomplete pass thrown into the back of his own endzone. However, New Orleans’ defense stiffened for the win.

With the loss, the Chargers went into their bye week at 3–5.

Week 10: vs. Kansas City Chiefs

Coming off their bye week, the Chargers went home for a Week 10 AFC West duel with the Kansas City Chiefs. In the first quarter, San Diego trailed early as Chiefs QB Tyler Thigpen completed a 30-yard TD pass to WR Mark Bradley. In the second quarter, the 'Bolts got on the board as kicker Nate Kaeding got a 34-yard and a 26-yard field goal. Kansas City would close out the half as Thigpen completed a 34-yard TD pass to TE Tony Gonzalez (with a failed 2-point conversion).

In the third quarter, the Chargers tied the game as QB Philip Rivers completed a 5-yard TD pass to WR Malcom Floyd. In the fourth quarter, San Diego took the lead as Rivers completed an 8-yard TD pass to TE Antonio Gates. The Chiefs tried to rally as Thigpen completed a 3-yard TD pass to Gonzalez after a very controversial Pass Interference call on Safety Clinton Hart, in which Gonzalez did not look for a flag, making the call even more controversial. Fortunately, the Chargers’ defense stopped both the 2-point conversion and the ensuing onside kick to preserve their much-needed victory.
Notable- This was the third game in which the Chargers suffered a very controversial call towards the end of the game

With the win, the 'Bolts improved to 4–5.

Week 11: at Pittsburgh Steelers

Coming off their divisional home win over the Chiefs, the Chargers flew to Heinz Field for a Week 11 duel with the Pittsburgh Steelers. In the first quarter, the 'Bolts struck first as RB LaDainian Tomlinson got a 3-yard TD run. In the second quarter, the Steelers slowly responded as LB James Harrison forced a fumble from QB Philip Rivers in his own endzone, which was picked up by OT Marcus McNeill, who got tackled by Harrison in the endzone for a safety. Pittsburgh would end the half as kicker Jeff Reed got a 21-yard field goal.

In the third quarter, the Steelers took the lead as Reed made a 22-yard field goal. In the fourth quarter, San Diego regained the lead as kicker Nate Kaeding made a 22-yard field goal. However, Pittsburgh got the lead as Reed nailed a 32-yard field goal.

With the loss, the Chargers fell to 4–6.

This marked the first of two times in NFL history that an NFL game ended with a final score of 11–10.
The second came in 2022, with the Broncos defeating the 49ers on Sunday Night Football.

Week 12: vs. Indianapolis Colts

Hoping to rebound from their road loss to the Steelers, the Chargers went home for a Week 12 Sunday Night game with the Indianapolis Colts. In the first quarter, San Diego trailed early as Colts kicker Adam Vinatieri made a 23-yard field goal. In the second quarter, the 'Bolts took the lead as kicker Nate Kaeding got a 35-yard field goal, while QB Philip Rivers completed a 39-yard TD pass to WR Vincent Jackson. Indianapolis would tie the game with QB Peyton Manning completing a 13-yard TD pass to WR Anthony Gonzalez.

In the third quarter, the Colts took the lead with Manning's 1-yard TD pass to RB Dominic Rhodes. In the fourth quarter, Indianapolis increased their lead as Vinatieri got a 38-yard field goal. San Diego would rally to tie the game as Rivers completed a 1-yard TD pass to rookie FB Jacob Hester, while Kaeding made a 47-yard field goal. However, the Colts came out on top as Vinatieri nailed the game-winning 51-yard field goal.

With the loss, the Chargers fell to 4–7. This marked the 5th game the Chargers lost in the last 24 seconds.

Week 13: vs. Atlanta Falcons

Hoping to rebound from their last-second loss to the Colts, the Chargers stayed at home for a Week 13 interconference duel with the Atlanta Falcons. In the first quarter, San Diego trailed early as Falcons kicker Jason Elam got a 35-yard field goal. The 'Bolts would strike back as RB LaDainian Tomlinson got a 3-yard TD run (which was his 136th career TD, tying him with Marshall Faulk for fifth all-time). Atlanta answered with Elam making a 40-yard field goal. In the second quarter, the Falcons took the lead as QB Matt Ryan completed an 18-yard TD pass to former Chargers TE Justin Peelle, along with Atlanta's defense forcing QB Philip Rivers to commit intentional grounding from his own endzone, giving the Falcons a safety.

In the third quarter, San Diego began to charge back as safety Eric Weddle returned a fumble 86 yards for a touchdown (with a failed two-point conversion). In the fourth quarter, Atlanta began to pull away as Ryan completed a 5-yard TD pass to WR Harry Douglas. The Chargers tried to come back as kicker Nate Kaeding nailed a 28-yard field goal. However, the Falcons’ defense prevented any possible comeback.

With the loss, the Chargers fell to 4–8. This was San Diego's seventh loss by one possession.

Week 14: vs. Oakland Raiders

Trying to snap a three-game losing streak, the Chargers stayed at home, donned their alternate uniforms again, and played a Week 14 AFC West rematch with the Oakland Raiders. In the first quarter, the 'Bolts struck first as kicker Nate Kaeding got a 20-yard field goal, along with RB LaDainian Tomlinson getting a 3-yard TD run. In the second quarter, San Diego increased their lead as QB Philip Rivers completed an 8-yard TD pass to RB Darren Sproles and a 59-yard TD pass to WR Vincent Jackson, while Kaeding made a 39-yard field goal. Oakland would close out the half with CB Justin Miller returning a kickoff 98 yards for a touchdown. After a scoreless third quarter, the 'Bolts pulled away in the fourth quarter as Rivers hooked up with Sproles again on an 18-yard TD pass.

With the sweep, the Chargers improved to 5–8.

Week 15: at Kansas City Chiefs

Hoping to get a 2nd straight win and stay alive for the playoffs, the Chargers went to Kansas City for a divisional road game vs. the Chiefs. The 'Bolts trailed early as RB Larry Johnson threw a 4-yard TD pass to TE Tony Gonzalez. The Chiefs extended the lead to 14–0 when QB Tyler Thigpen completed a 1-yard TD pass to WR Dwayne Bowe. The 'Bolts closed out the half with Nate Kaeding getting a 32-yard field goal. The Chiefs started the 2nd half by Thigpen scrambling for a 3-yard TD. The Chargers started to rally as RB LaDainian Tomlinson getting a 6-yard TD run, while QB Philip Rivers completed a 4-yard TD to Malcom Floyd (with a failed 2-pt conversion) with 1:19 left in the game. The 'Bolts recovered the onside kick and Rivers threw a 10-yard TD to WR Vincent Jackson with 40 seconds left (with another failed 2-pt try). to take a 22–21 lead. The Chiefs’ only answer was kicker Connor Barth's 50-yard field goal try sailing wide left as time expired.

With the comeback win the Chargers improved to 6–8 and stayed in the hunt for a playoff spot.

Week 16: at Tampa Bay Buccaneers

Coming off their season-sweep of the Chiefs, the Chargers flew to Raymond James Stadium for a Week 16 interconference duel with the Tampa Bay Buccaneers. In the first quarter, San Diego struck first as quarterback Philip Rivers completed an 11-yard touchdown pass to tight end Brandon Manumaleuna. The Buccaneers would respond with fullback B.J. Askew getting a 1-yard touchdown run. The Chargers would answer in the second quarter Rivers completing a 15-yard touchdown pass to tight end Antonio Gates, followed by kicker Nate Kaeding getting a 28-yard field goal. Tampa Bay would answer with kicker Matt Bryant getting a 49-yard field goal. San Diego would close out the first half with Kaeding's 57-yard field goal.

The Buccaneers would take the lead in the third quarter with quarterback Jeff Garcia getting a 7-yard touchdown run and completing a 71-yard touchdown pass to wide receiver Antonio Bryant. Afterwards, in the fourth quarter, the Chargers rallied to victory with Rivers completing a 5-yard touchdown pass to Gates and a 32-yard touchdown pass to running back Darren Sproles, followed by cornerback Antoine Cason returning an interception 59 yards for a touchdown.

With the win, San Diego kept their playoff hopes alive at 7–8.

Week 17 vs. Denver Broncos

Coming off their road win over the Buccaneers, the Chargers went home for a crucial Week 17 AFC West rematch with the Denver Broncos, with the division crown on the line.

In the first quarter, San Diego struck first as kicker Nate Kaeding got a 28-yard field goal. The Broncos would respond with running back Tatum Bell getting a 26-yard touchdown run (with a failed PAT), yet the Chargers answered with running back LaDainian Tomlinson’s 1-yard touchdown run. In the second quarter, San Diego would jump out to a big lead as quarterback Philip Rivers completed a 12-yard touchdown pass to tight end Brandon Manumaleuna, followed by Tomlinson's 4-yard touchdown run.

Denver would try to rally in the third quarter as Bell got a 37-yard touchdown run, yet the Chargers struck back with Rivers completing a 13-yard touchdown pass to running back Darren Sproles, followed by a 14-yard touchdown run by Tomlinson. The Broncos would try to make a comeback in the fourth quarter as quarterback Jay Cutler completed a 25-yard touchdown pass to tight end Tony Scheffler (followed by Cutler's 2-point conversion run), yet San Diego pulled away with Sproles’ 2-yard touchdown run and ending with rookie fullback Jacob Hester’s 4-yard touchdown run.

With the win, not only did the Chargers finish their season at 8–8, but they also won the AFC West title and clinched the AFC's #4 seed.

Postseason results

Wild Card vs. Colts 

Entering the postseason as the AFC's fourth seed, the Chargers began their playoff run at home in the AFC Wild Card round against the #5 Indianapolis Colts, in a rematch of their Week 12 contest. San Diego trailed in the first quarter after Colts running back Joseph Addai got a 1-yard touchdown run. The Chargers responded in the second quarter as running back LaDainian Tomlinson got a 3-yard touchdown run. Indianapolis answered with a 43-yard field goal from kicker Adam Vinatieri, yet San Diego got the halftime lead with running back Darren Sproles' 9-yard touchdown run.

The Colts took the lead in the third quarter when quarterback Peyton Manning hiked the ball while the Chargers weren't paying attention and completed a 72-yard touchdown pass to wide receiver Reggie Wayne, but then San Diego tied the game in the fourth quarter as kicker Nate Kaeding nailed a 26-yard field goal. In overtime, the Chargers delivered the final strike as Sproles got the game-winning 22-yard touchdown run.

With the win, San Diego improved their overall record to 9–8.

AFC Divisional Round: at Pittsburgh Steelers 

Coming off their impressive wild card home win over the Colts, the Chargers flew to Heinz Field for their AFC Divisional round duel with the #2 Pittsburgh Steelers, in a rematch of their Week 11 contest.

San Diego got off to a fast start in the first quarter as quarterback Philip Rivers completed a 41-yard touchdown pass to wide receiver Vincent Jackson. The Steelers responded with wide receiver Santonio Holmes returning a punt 67 yards for a touchdown. The Chargers answered in the second quarter as kicker Nate Kaeding got a 42-yard field goal, but Pittsburgh struck back with running back Willie Parker’s 3-yard touchdown run.

The Steelers would add to their lead in the third quarter as quarterback Ben Roethlisberger completed an 8-yard touchdown pass to tight end Heath Miller. The San Diego Chargers ran exactly one offensive play in the third quarter, which resulted in a Philip Rivers interception off a deflection. In the fourth quarter, San Diego tried to rally as Rivers completed a 4-yard touchdown pass to wide receiver Legedu Naanee, but Pittsburgh answered with Parker's 16-yard touchdown run. The Chargers tried to come back as Rivers completed a 62-yard touchdown pass to running back Darren Sproles, but San Diego's onside kick attempt failed, allowing the Steelers to seal the win.

With the loss, the Chargers’ season ended with an overall record of 9–9.

References

San Diego Chargers
San Diego Chargers seasons
AFC West championship seasons
San Diego